Renan Mota do Nascimento Pegado (born 31 January 1987), better known as Renan Barão, is a Brazilian professional mixed martial artist and the former UFC Bantamweight Champion. He held one of the longest unbeaten streaks in MMA history - following a loss in his professional debut, he recorded 32 straight fights without a loss (31 victories and 1 no contest) over a span of 9 years. During his championship reign, he was ranked as a top 3 pound for pound fighter and regarded as one of the best mixed martial artists in the world. His nickname Barão (baron), which predates his athletic career, was given to him by his grandmother after a character in the 1986 Brazilian soap opera Sinhá Moça.

Mixed martial arts career
He started his career in Kimura Nova União, a sports school in Natal, Rio Grande do Norte, Brazil. Since turning professional in 2005, Barão has competed for Shooto Brazil and other smaller organizations in his native country of Brazil, having fought Rony Mariano Bezerra and Anistavio "Gasparzinho" Medeiros both former The Ultimate Fighter: Brazil contestants. He is a teammate and training partner of former WEC Featherweight Champion and former UFC Featherweight Champion José Aldo at Nova União. He received his Brazilian Jiu-Jitsu black belt from André Pederneiras in September 2011 becoming the 100th black belt under Pederneiras in the process.

In January 2010, Sherdog named him their top prospect in their list of "10 Brazilians to watch in 2010"

World Extreme Cagefighting
Barão was expected to make his North American, as well as WEC debut in a Bantamweight bout against Clint Godfrey on 20 June 2010 at WEC 49, but Godfrey was forced from the card with an injury. Barão instead faced fellow WEC newcomer Anthony Leone at an agreed 142 lb catchweight. Barão defeated Leone via submission (armbar) in the third round.

Barão defeated Chris Cariaso by rear-naked choke submission in the first round on 16 December 2010 at WEC 53.

Ultimate Fighting Championship & Interim UFC Bantamweight Championship
In October 2010, the WEC merged with the UFC. As part of the merger, all WEC fighters were transferred to the UFC.

Barão was expected to make his UFC debut on 28 May 2011 against Demetrious Johnson at UFC 130, but an undisclosed injury forced Brad Pickett out of his fight with Miguel Torres on the same card. Johnson moved up to fight Torres, while Barão faced Cole Escovedo.  Barão won his debut fight in the organization via unanimous decision.

Barão faced Brad Pickett on 5 November 2011 at UFC 138. He defeated Pickett by rear-naked choke submission in the first round, also winning Fight of the Night honors.

Barão faced Scott Jorgensen on 4 February 2012 at UFC 143. He won the fight by unanimous decision.

Barão was expected to face Ivan Menjivar on 7 July 2012 at UFC 148 to possibly determine the number one contender.  Barão instead faced Urijah Faber for the Interim Bantamweight title after current champion Dominick Cruz was injured.  It was originally scheduled to take place at UFC 148 however, due to an injury to headliner José Aldo (who was supposed to make a title defence in the event's main event fight), the Faber/Barão bout was moved to 21 July 2012 and headlined UFC 149 for the Interim Bantamweight Championship.  He won the fight via unanimous decision to become the Interim UFC Bantamweight Champion. He was expected to face Dominick Cruz for the unified UFC Bantamweight Championship at a later date. However, it was announced on 4 December 2012 that Dominick Cruz suffered a second ACL tear that would require surgery, leaving Cruz now sidelined for 6–9 months.

In his first title defense, Barão retained the UFC Interim Bantamweight Championship against Michael McDonald on 16 February 2013 at UFC on Fuel TV: Barão vs. McDonald. McDonald was competitive with capable take-down defense and crisp boxing - particularly - in the first two rounds, but was worn down by Barão's more diverse skill-set as he mixed in knees and kicks standing, and often looked to take the fight to the floor (with success). Upon executing a strong take-down in the fourth round, McDonald tried to explode to his feet but instead gave Barão opportunity to expertly secure an arm-triangle choke while passing into side control: McDonald tapped at 3:57 in the fourth round. The win also won him his first Submission of the Night honors.

Barão was scheduled to make his second interim title defense against Eddie Wineland on 15 June 2013 at UFC 161. However, on 21 May it was confirmed that Barão had pulled out of the bout, citing a foot injury.

The bout with Wineland was rescheduled for 21 September 2013 at UFC 165. Barão retained the title with a second-round TKO victory via spinning back kick and subsequent punches to the face. With this victory Barão made history as the first and only fighter ever to defend an interim title more than once in the UFC. The win also resulted in Barão receiving his first Knockout of the Night bonus award.

UFC Bantamweight Champion

Barão was expected to face Dominick Cruz to unify the UFC Bantamweight Championship on 1 February 2014 at UFC 169. However, on a 6 January episode of SportsCenter, UFC president Dana White announced that Dominick Cruz had torn his groin, therefore being stripped of the UFC Bantamweight Championship, and Barão would become the undisputed UFC Bantamweight Champion, with his first unified title defense against Urijah Faber at UFC 169. Barão successfully defended his title by defeating Faber via TKO in the first round.

For his second title defense, Barão faced T.J. Dillashaw in the main event at UFC 173 on 24 May 2014. Barão was a huge favorite, but Dillashaw won the fight in dominant fashion out striking Barão in all five rounds, Dillashaw won via TKO in the fifth round to become the new UFC Bantamweight Champion. It was one of the greatest upsets in UFC history. The fight earned the Fight of the Night award.

Back to title contention

An immediate rematch with Dillashaw was scheduled to take place on 30 August 2014 at UFC 177. However, the day of the weigh-ins, Barão had to be admitted to the hospital as a result of his attempts to cut weight, and was removed from the card. Dillashaw eventually fought UFC newcomer Joe Soto whom he defeated by 5th-round knockout.

In his first fight since losing the title, Barão faced Mitch Gagnon on 20 December 2014 at UFC Fight Night 58. He won the fight via arm-triangle submission in the third round. The win also earned Barão his first Performance of the Night bonus award.

A rematch with Dillashaw was rescheduled and was expected to take place on 25 April 2015 at UFC 186.  However a month before the event, Dillashaw was forced out of the bout after sustaining a broken rib while training.

The rematch with Dillashaw eventually took place at UFC on Fox 16 on 25 July 2015. Barão lost the fight via TKO in the opening moments of the fourth round.

Move back to Featherweight

Barão next faced Jeremy Stephens in a featherweight bout on 29 May 2016 at UFC Fight Night 88. He lost the back and forth fight by unanimous decision. Both participants were awarded Fight of the Night honors for their performance.

Barão faced Phillipe Nover on 24 September 2016 at UFC Fight Night 95. He won the fight via unanimous decision.

Barão was briefly linked to a bout with Doo Ho Choi which was expected to take place on 15 April 2017 at UFC on Fox 24. However, as the announcement of the pairing began to circulate, Choi declined the bout, and as a result, Barão is expected to be rescheduled against a different opponent, possibly at another event.

Bantamweight return
Barão faced Aljamain Sterling on 29 July 2017 at UFC 214. The fight was initially contracted to be contested at bantamweight, however on 28 June, the CSAC announced that they would not license Barão to compete at that weight due to his past struggle to make the required weight at UFC 177. The bout with Sterling proceeded as scheduled at a catchweight of 140 lbs. Barão lost the bout by unanimous decision.

Barão faced Brian Kelleher on 24 February 2018 at UFC on Fox 28. He lost the fight by unanimous decision.

Barão faced Andre Ewell on 22 September 2018 at UFC Fight Night 137.  At weigh-ins, Barão weighted five pounds over bantamweight non-title fight limit of 136 and he was fined 30 percent of his purse to Ewell. Barão lost the fight via split decision.

Barão faced Luke Sanders on 17 February 2019 at UFC on ESPN 1. At the weigh-ins, Barão weighed in at 138 pounds, 2 pounds over the bantamweight non-title fight upper limit of 136 pounds. As a result, the bout proceeded at catchweight and  Barão was fined 20% of his purse which went to his opponent, Sanders. Barão lost the fight via knockout in the second round.

Barão faced Douglas Silva de Andrade in a featherweight bout on 16 November 2019 at UFC on ESPN+ 22. He lost the fight by unanimous decision.

In early December 2019, it was reported that Barão had been released from the UFC.

Post-UFC career
On 3 August 2020, news surfaced that Barão had signed a three-fight contract with Taura MMA. He was expected to make his promotional debut against Bobby Moffett at Taura MMA 12 on 21 November 2020. However, the event was postponed due to COVID-19 pandemic related issues.

Barão was scheduled to face Tyson Duckworth on November 19, 2021, at Premier FC 32 for the Premier FC Featherweight Championship. However Duckworth pulled out of the bout the day before, not getting on his flight.

Barão was scheduled to face Horacio Gutiérrez on January 28, 2022, at EFC 44, but the bout was cancelled.

Barão was scheduled to face William Gomis at ARES FC 7 on June 25, 2022. He later pulled out of the bout.

Championships and awards
Ultimate Fighting Championship
UFC Bantamweight Championship (One time)
 One successful title defense
Interim UFC Bantamweight Championship (One time)
 Two successful title defenses
Fight of the Night (Three times)  vs. Brad Pickett, T.J. Dillashaw, Jeremy Stephens 
Performance of the Night (One time) vs. Mitch Gagnon 
Knockout of the Night (One time) vs. Eddie Wineland 
Submission of the Night (One time) vs. Michael McDonald 
Tied for second longest win streak in UFC Bantamweight history (7)

Mixed martial arts record

|-
|Loss
|align=center|34–9 (1)
|Douglas Silva de Andrade
|Decision (unanimous)
|UFC Fight Night: Błachowicz vs. Jacaré 
|
|align=center|3
|align=center|5:00
|São Paulo, Brazil
|
|-
|Loss
|align=center|34–8 (1)
|Luke Sanders
|KO (punches)
|UFC on ESPN: Ngannou vs. Velasquez 
|
|align=center|2
|align=center|1:01
|Phoenix, Arizona, United States
|
|-
|Loss
|align=center|34–7 (1)
|Andre Ewell
|Decision (split)
|UFC Fight Night: Santos vs. Anders 
|
|align=center|3
|align=center|5:00
|São Paulo, Brazil
|
|-
|Loss
|align=center| 34–6 (1)
|Brian Kelleher
|Decision (unanimous)
|UFC on Fox: Emmett vs. Stephens 
|
|align=center|3
|align=center|5:00
|Orlando, Florida, United States
|
|-
|Loss
|align=center| 34–5 (1)
|Aljamain Sterling
|Decision (unanimous)
|UFC 214
|
|align=center|3
|align=center|5:00
|Anaheim, California, United States
|
|-
| Win
| align=center| 34–4 (1)
| Phillipe Nover
| Decision (unanimous)
| UFC Fight Night: Cyborg vs. Länsberg
| 
| align=center| 3
| align=center| 5:00
| Brasília, Brazil
|  
|-
| Loss
| align=center| 33–4 (1)
| Jeremy Stephens
| Decision (unanimous)
| UFC Fight Night: Almeida vs. Garbrandt
| 
| align=center| 3
| align=center| 5:00
| Las Vegas, Nevada, United States
|
|-
| Loss
| align=center| 33–3 (1)
| T.J. Dillashaw
| TKO (punches)
| UFC on Fox: Dillashaw vs. Barão 2
| 
| align=center| 4
| align=center| 0:35
| Chicago, Illinois, United States
| 
|-
| Win
| align=center| 33–2 (1)
| Mitch Gagnon
| Submission (arm-triangle choke)
| UFC Fight Night: Machida vs. Dollaway
| 
| align=center| 3
| align=center| 3:53
| Barueri, Brazil
| 
|-
| Loss
| align=center| 32–2 (1)
| T.J. Dillashaw
| TKO (head kick and punches)
| UFC 173
| 
| align=center| 5
| align=center| 2:26
| Las Vegas, Nevada, United States
| 
|-
| Win
| align=center| 32–1 (1)
| Urijah Faber
| TKO (punches)
| UFC 169
| 
| align=center| 1
| align=center| 3:42
| Newark, New Jersey, United States
| 
|-
| Win
| align=center| 31–1 (1)
| Eddie Wineland
| TKO (spinning back kick and punches)
| UFC 165
| 
| align=center| 2
| align=center| 0:35
| Toronto, Ontario, Canada
| 
|-
| Win
| align=center| 30–1 (1)
| Michael McDonald
| Submission (arm-triangle choke)
| UFC on Fuel TV: Barão vs. McDonald
| 
| align=center| 4
| align=center| 3:57
| London, England
| 
|-
| Win
| align=center| 29–1 (1)
| Urijah Faber
| Decision (unanimous)
| UFC 149
| 
| align=center| 5
| align=center| 5:00
| Calgary, Alberta, Canada
| 
|-
| Win
| align=center| 28–1 (1)
| Scott Jorgensen
| Decision (unanimous)
| UFC 143
| 
| align=center| 3
| align=center| 5:00
| Las Vegas, Nevada, United States
| 
|-
| Win 
| align=center| 27–1 (1)   
| Brad Pickett
| Submission (rear-naked choke)
| UFC 138
| 
| align=center| 1
| align=center| 4:09
| Birmingham, England
| 
|-
| Win
| align=center| 26–1 (1)
| Cole Escovedo
| Decision (unanimous)
| UFC 130
| 
| align=center| 3
| align=center| 5:00
| Las Vegas, Nevada, United States
| 
|-
| Win
| align=center| 25–1 (1)
| Chris Cariaso
| Submission (rear-naked choke)
| WEC 53
| 
| align=center| 1
| align=center| 3:47
| Glendale, Arizona, United States
| 
|-
| Win
| align=center| 24–1 (1)
| Anthony Leone
| Submission (armbar)
| WEC 49
| 
| align=center| 3
| align=center| 2:29
| Edmonton, Alberta, Canada
| 
|-
| Win
| align=center| 23–1 (1)
| Sérgio Silva
| Decision (unanimous)
| Jungle Fight 17: Vila Velha
| 
| align=center| 3
| align=center| 5:00
| Vila Velha, Brazil
| 
|-
| Win
| align=center| 22–1 (1)
| Jorge Enciso
| Submission (rear-naked choke)
| Platinum Fight Brazil 2
| 
| align=center| 1
| align=center| 3:42
| Rio de Janeiro, Brazil
| 
|-
| Win
| align=center| 21–1 (1)
| Marcio Nunes
| Submission (kimura)
| Eagle Fighting Championship
| 
| align=center| 1
| align=center| 2:45
| São Paulo, Brazil
| 
|-
| Win
| align=center| 20–1 (1)
| Paulo Dantas
| Decision (unanimous)
| Shooto 13
| 
| align=center| 3
| align=center| 5:00
| Fortaleza, Brazil
| 
|-
| Win
| align=center| 19–1 (1)
| Jurandir Sardinha
| TKO (punches)
| Platinum Fight Brazil
| 
| align=center| 2
| align=center| 0:21
| Natal, Brazil
| 
|-
| Win
| align=center| 18–1 (1)
| Andre Luiz
| Submission (triangle choke)
| Watch Out Combat Show 3
| 
| align=center| 3
| align=center| 1:38
| Rio de Janeiro, Brazil
| 
|-
| Win
| align=center| 17–1 (1)
| Alexandre Pinheiro
| TKO (arm injury)
| Shooto Brazil 9
| 
| align=center| 3
| align=center| 0:58
| Fortaleza, Brazil
| 
|-
| Win
| align=center| 16–1 (1)
| Rogerio Silva
| Submission (rear-naked choke)
| Watch Out Combat Show 2
| 
| align=center| 2
| align=center| 3:21
| Rio de Janeiro, Brazil
| 
|-
| Win
| align=center| 15–1 (1)
| William Porfirio
| KO (knee)
| Watch Out Combat Show 2
| 
| align=center| 1
| align=center| 2:25
| Rio de Janeiro, Brazil
| 
|-
| Win
| align=center| 14–1 (1)
| Fabiano Lucas
| Decision (unanimous)
| Shooto Brazil 8
| 
| align=center| 3
| align=center| 5:00
| Rio de Janeiro, Brazil
| 
|-
| Win
| align=center| 13–1 (1)
| Jetron Azevedo
| Submission (armbar)
| Leal Combat
| 
| align=center| 1
| align=center| 4:56
| Natal, Brazil
| 
|-
| Win
| align=center| 12–1 (1)
| Ronaldo Figueiredo 
| Decision (unanimous)
| Natal Cage Vale Tudo
| 
| align=center| 3
| align=center| 5:00
| Natal, Brazil
| 
|-
| Win
| align=center| 11–1 (1)
| William Vianna
| Decision (unanimous)
| Shooto Brazil 6
| 
| align=center| 3
| align=center| 5:00
| Rio de Janeiro, Brazil
| 
|-
| NC
| align=center| 10–1 (1)
| Claudemir Souza
| NC (illegal soccer kick)
| Black Bull Vale Tudo
| 
| align=center| 1
| align=center| 5:00
| Recife, Brazil
| 
|-
| Win
| align=center| 10–1
| Danilo Noronha
| Submission (rear-naked choke)
| Shooto Brazil 4
| 
| align=center| 1
| align=center| 0:33
| Rio de Janeiro, Brazil
| 
|-
| Win
| align=center| 9–1
| Erinaldo Rodriguez
| Submission (ankle lock)
| Shooto Brazil 3
| 
| align=center| 1
| align=center| 1:33
| Rio de Janeiro, Brazil
| 
|-
| Win
| align=center| 8–1
| Carlos Heide
| Submission (triangle choke)
| Garra Fight
| 
| align=center| 1
| align=center| N/A
| Natal, Brazil
| 
|-
| Win
| align=center| 7–1
| Janailson Pereira
| Decision (split)
| Garra Fight
| 
| align=center| 3
| align=center| 5:00
| Natal, Brazil
| 
|-
| Win
| align=center| 6–1
| Rony Jason
| Decision (split)
| Cage Fight Nordeste
| 
| align=center| 3
| align=center| 5:00
| Natal, Brazil
| 
|-
| Win
| align=center| 5–1
| Caio Robson
| TKO (punches)
| Nordest Combat Championship
| 
| align=center| 1
| align=center| 2:45
| Natal, Brazil
| 
|-
| Win
| align=center| 4–1
| Gleison Menezes
| Submission (kneebar)
| Rino's FC 2
| 
| align=center| 1
| align=center| N/A
| Recife, Brazil
| 
|-
| Win
| align=center| 3–1
| Dande Dande
| KO
| Fight Ship Looking Boy 2
| 
| align=center| 1
| align=center| N/A
| Natal, Brazil
| 
|-
| Win
| align=center| 2–1
| Anistavio Medeiros
| Submission (rear-naked choke)
| Mossoro Fight
| 
| align=center| 2
| align=center| 3:41
| Mossoró, Brazil
| 
|-
| Win
| align=center| 1–1
| Melk Freitas
| TKO (punches)
| Tremons Fight
| 
| align=center| 3
| align=center| 1:41
| João Câmara, Brazil
| 
|-
| Loss
| align=center| 0–1
| João Paulo Rodrigues
| Decision (unanimous)
| Heat FC 3
| 
| align=center| 3
| align=center| 5:00
| Natal, Brazil
|

Pay-per-view bouts

See also
 List of WEC Events
 List of current UFC fighters
 List of male mixed martial artists

References

External links
 
 

|-

1987 births
Living people
Brazilian male mixed martial artists
Brazilian practitioners of Brazilian jiu-jitsu
Bantamweight mixed martial artists
Mixed martial artists utilizing Brazilian jiu-jitsu
People awarded a black belt in Brazilian jiu-jitsu
People from Natal, Rio Grande do Norte
Ultimate Fighting Championship male fighters
Ultimate Fighting Championship champions
Sportspeople from Rio Grande do Norte